The 1937 Pau Grand Prix was a motor race held on 21 February 1937 at the Pau circuit, in Pau, Pyrénées-Atlantiques, France. The Grand Prix was won by Jean-Pierre Wimille, driving the Bugatti T59S. Raymond Sommer finished second and René Dreyfus third.

Classification

Race

References

Pau Grand Prix
1937 in French motorsport